Blue Max 2001 is a diagonally-scrolling shooter written by Bob Polin (also credited as Rob Polin) for the Atari 8-bit family and published by Synapse Software in 1984. A Commodore 64 version was released the same year. Blue Max 2001 is the sequel to 1983's Blue Max, also by Polin, with the player piloting a futuristic hovercraft instead of a World War I biplane. Critics found the game disappointing compared with the original.

Gameplay

Reception
In contrast to the positive reception given to the original, reviews of Blue Max 2001 on both Atari and Commodore systems were mixed.

Ahoy! called the Commodore 64 release an "exciting sequel" which "extends and refines the elements which made the original game popular, while it introduces enough new challenges to generate fresh excitement." Zzap!64 called the C64 version "one of the most disappointing sequels of all time." Reviewer Julian Rignall wrote that "The graphics are very poor," calling out the "jelly mould" ship and "wonky" perspective. He mentioned the control difficulty caused by use of the joystick diagonals and left-to-right scrolling.

Atari magazine Page 6 also considered it a "disappointment" compared to its predecessor, noting that the ship resembles a Polo mint and is "a nightmare to fly, far less operate the bombs and lasers, with any degree of accuracy." Bill Kunkel wrote  in an Atari Explorer review, "this game is plagued with ridiculous terminology and some of the shoddiest documention since the days when computer software was sold in baggies." Antic commented the Atari version had "fairly good graphics with some interesting touches" and despite problems with documentation it was "well worth the effort" in persevering.

References

External links
Blue Max 2001 at Atari Mania

1984 video games
Atari 8-bit family games
Commodore 64 games
Scrolling shooters
Synapse Software games
U.S. Gold games
Video game sequels
Video games developed in the United States
Video games with oblique graphics